Thomas Fuller (March 8, 1823 – September 28, 1898) was an English-born Canadian architect. From 1881 to 1896, he was Chief Dominion Architect for the Government of Canada, during which time he played a role in the design and construction of every major federal building.

Fuller was born in Bath, Somerset, England, where he trained as an architect.  While living in Bath and London, he did a number of projects.  In 1845, he left for Antigua, where he spent two years working on the new St John's Cathedral, before emigrating to Canada in 1857.  Settling in Toronto, he formed a partnership with Chilion Jones with Fuller responsible for design work.  The company first won the contract to design the Church of St. Stephen-in-the-Fields.

In 1859, The Legislative Assembly in Ottawa voted the sum of £75,000 for the erection of a "Parliament House" and offered a premium of $1000 for the best design within that budget. The winning bid was made by Fuller and Jones for a Neo-Gothic design. The principal architects until its completion in 1866 were Thomas Fuller and Charles Baillairge. In Hand Book to the Parliamentary and Departmental Buildings, Canada (1867), Joseph Bureau wrote, "The corner stone was laid with great ceremony by His Royal Highness the Prince of Wales in September, 1860, on which occasion the rejoicings partook of the nature of the place, the lumber arches and men being a novelty to most of its visitors, bullocks and sheep were roasted whole upon the government ground and all comers were feasted."

In 1867 he won the contract to build the New York State Capitol building in Albany, New York, and spent the next several years in the United States. The project ran into severe cost overruns and an inquiry blamed Fuller. Fuller thus returned to Canada and, unable to work in the more lucrative private sector, in 1881 became Chief Dominion Architect, replacing Thomas Seaton Scott.

The Department of Public Works erected a number of small urban post offices in smaller urban centres during Thomas Fuller's term as Chief Architect.

Family 
Thomas Fuller's son, Thomas W. Fuller, was also appointed Chief Architect in 1927. Thomas W. Fuller's son, Thomas G. Fuller spent more than 50 years in the building industry. In 2002, Thomas Fuller Construction Co. Limited (established 1958) was awarded the contract for the Library of Parliament building rehabilitation

Legacy 
A 35 cent, 3 colour postage stamp featured an image of the Parliament Buildings and the text 'Royal Canadian Academy of Arts, 1880–1980, Thomas Fuller'

Works 

On his death in 1898, Thomas Fuller was interred in the Beechwood Cemetery in Ottawa. His son Thomas Fuller II also became an architect.

Several of his buildings in Bath have been threatened with demolition and other works, such as his Bradford-on-Avon Town Hall, have been converted into other uses (the Town Hall is now the St Thomas More Roman Catholic Church, Bradford-on-Avon).

In 2002, the Thomas Fuller Construction Company, founded by Fuller's grandson Thomas G. Fuller and now operated by his great grandsons, was awarded a contract to renovate the Library of Parliament in Ottawa which he originally designed.

References 

Canada by Design: Parliament Hill, Ottawa at Library and Archives Canada

External links 

Biography at the Dictionary of Canadian Biography Online
Thomas Fuller biography from St. Stephen-in-the-Fields
Thomas Fuller (architect), Chief Dominion Architect 1881–1896
Canada`s Historic Places
Family: When Simon Fuller designed and built his house at Britannia on the Bay, he drew on family traditions and on his own passion for the river to create a unique and wonderful setting for family life By Janet Uren Photography by Gordon King

1823 births
1898 deaths
Architects from Bath, Somerset
British expatriates in Canada
Canadian architects
19th-century English architects
Persons of National Historic Significance (Canada)
Burials at Beechwood Cemetery (Ottawa)